China National Highway 331 (G331) runs along the northern Chinese border from Dandong,   Liaoning to Altay, Xinjiang. Once fully completed it will be about 9,200 kilometres in length.

Route and distance

See also 

 China National Highways
 China National Highway 219, running along the western and southern border
 China National Highway 228, which follows the coastline of China

References 

Transport in Liaoning
Transport in Jilin
Transport in Inner Mongolia
Transport in Gansu
Transport in Xinjiang
Transport in Heilongjiang